Sumner Public School, also known as the Daniel Boone Apartments, is a historic school building located at Boonville, Cooper County, Missouri. It was built in 1915, and is a two-story, rectangular brick structure with a central projecting bay.  The roof is framed by a stepped, corbelled parapet on the front facade.  The school served as an African-American public school until converted into apartments in 1939–1940.

It was listed on the National Register of Historic Places in 1990.

References

Historically segregated African-American schools in Missouri
School buildings on the National Register of Historic Places in Missouri
School buildings completed in 1915
Schools in Cooper County, Missouri
National Register of Historic Places in Cooper County, Missouri
1915 establishments in Missouri
Apartment buildings in Missouri
Boonville, Missouri